Ophichthus stenopterus is an eel in the family Ophichthidae (worm/snake eels). It was described by Edward Drinker Cope in 1871. It is a marine, tropical eel which is known from the western central Pacific Ocean.

References

Taxa named by Edward Drinker Cope
Fish described in 1871
stenopterus